The 9th Korfball World Championship was held in Shaoxing, China, on October 27 – November 5, 2011 with 16 national teams in competition.

Teams

Pool matches
Legend

Second round

Title pools
Done with the two best teams in every pool of the first round, carrying forward their match result.

Pools for 9th–16th places
Done with the two last teams in every pool of the first round, carrying forward their match result.

Semifinals

13th–16th places

9th–12th places

5th–8th places

Championship semifinals

Finals
15th–16th places

13th–14th places

11th–12th places

9th–10th places

7th–8th places

5th–6th places

3rd–4th places

FINAL

Final standings

See also
Korfball World Championship
International Korfball Federation

References

External links
World Championship website
International Korfball Federation

Korfball World Championship
IKF World Korfball Championship
2011 in Chinese sport
Korfball in China